The Angola slaty flycatcher (Melaenornis brunneus) is a small passerine bird in the flycatcher family Muscicapidae. It is sometimes placed in the genus Dioptrornis instead of Melaenornis. As suggested by its common name, it is endemic to Angola.

References

Angola slaty flycatcher
Endemic birds of Angola
Angola slaty flycatcher